J. Ann Selzer is an American political pollster who is the president of the Des Moines, Iowa-based polling firm Selzer & Company, which she founded in 1996. Her polls of Iowa voters have a reputation for being highly accurate, based on their performance in major elections from 2008 through 2020. She has been described as "the best pollster in politics" by Clare Malone of FiveThirtyEight, which also gives Selzer & Company a rare A+ grade for accuracy.

Early life and education 
Selzer was born in Rochester, Minnesota, in 1956, the middle child in a family of five. She was raised in Topeka, Kansas. Selzer attended the University of Kansas, initially as a pre-med student, but eventually lost interest in medicine. She graduated with a Bachelor of Arts in Speech and Dramatics Arts in 1978. She then earned a Ph.D in Communication Theory and Research from the University of Iowa in 1984.

Career
After grad school, Selzer worked for The Des Moines Register. She established her own polling firm, Selzer & Company, in 1996. She has worked as the pollster for the Des Moines Register for many years, and has "overseen nearly every one of the Register’s Iowa Polls since 1987", according to FiveThirtyEight. She has also done polling work for numerous other news organizations, including the Detroit Free Press and the Indianapolis Star. Recently, Selzer has partnered with the highly ranked Grinnell College as a part of the Grinnell College National Poll program.

Selzer was the only pollster to correctly predict Barack Obama's comfortable victory in the 2008 Iowa Democratic caucuses, and her poll of the 2014 United States Senate election in Iowa also mirrored the actual result exceptionally closely.

Selzer & Co. conducted their final 2016 Iowa poll in early November, showing Donald Trump ahead of Hillary Clinton by 7 percentage points. Most other polls at the time showed a much closer race. Trump won Iowa by 9.4 percentage points. On October 31, 2020, Selzer's highly-anticipated last poll of Iowa before the 2020 elections was released. It showed Trump ahead of Joe Biden by 7 percentage points, and Republican Senator Joni Ernst ahead of Democratic challenger Theresa Greenfield by 4 percentage points. This was the only poll conducted in fall 2020 to show Trump ahead by more than 2 points. Ernst's race was considered a toss-up at the time. Trump eventually won Iowa by 8.2 percentage points, and Ernst was re-elected by a 6.6 point margin. In a post-election interview with Bloomberg, Selzer suggested that her polls' consistently high performance may be related to making fewer assumptions about the electorate, but rather "I assumed nothing. My data told me."

As of January 2021, Selzer works out of an office in West Des Moines, Iowa.

References

Further reading 

 
 
 
 

1957 births
American political women
Living people
People from Des Moines, Iowa
People from Topeka, Kansas
Pollsters
University of Iowa alumni
University of Kansas alumni
21st-century American women